Panty Raid (foaled March 8, 2004 in Kentucky) is an American Thoroughbred racehorse. A grade I winner on dirt and turf, she is a millionaire daughter of Include who raced for the Greathouse family’s Glencrest Farm and Dan Taylor. Panty Raid was nominated for an Eclipse Award for the American Champion Three-Year-Old Filly in 2007 but finished a close third behind Octave. Both Octave and Panty Raid finished behind in the voting to champion Rags to Riches. Panty Raid will best be remembered for her stirring victory in the Grade II $200,000 Black-Eyed Susan Stakes on May 19, 2007.

Early career

Glencrest bought Panty Raid for $275,000 at the 2006 Keeneland April sale of 2-year-olds in training from Niall Brennan Stables, agent. Panty Raid was the daughter of Pimlico Special Handicap winner Include produced from the stakes-placed Private Account mare Adventurous Di.

Three-year-old season

Panty Raid started her sophomore season with two strong performances but missed the winners circle twice as she placed in the grade two Falls City Handicap at Churchill Downs at nine furlongs and the grade three Bourbonette Oaks at Turfway Park at one mile.

In May her connections decided to enter her in the second jewel of America's de facto Filly Triple Crown, the $250,000 grade two Black-Eyed Susan Stakes. Panty Raid was the second choice at 5-2 on the morning line in a strong field of eight stakes winners. After breaking cleanly from post two in a field of three-year-old fillies, Panty Raid saved ground around both turns riding close to the rail of the 1-1/8-mile race. At the top of the stretch Panty Raid angled out for the drive. Baroness Thatcher, ridden by Garrett Gomez, clung grimly to the lead as she passed the furlong pole, but she was no match for the steady run of Panty Raid, who prevailed by a length over Winning Point, the 3-1 third choice. Baroness Thatcher, the 8-5 favorite, was another neck back in third. Panty Raid's romp on ESPN's national TV broadcast on the Preakness undercard enhanced her reputation greatly and moved her to the top of her age group.

Panty Raid accomplished a rarity last year for a 3-year-old filly. She beat older fillies and mares in both the grade one American Oaks Invitational on the turf at Hollywood Park and the grade one Juddmonte Spinster Stakes at Keeneland on the polytrack. She has won on dirt, turf and synthetics at distances ranging from six furlongs to 10 furlongs, and had won four of her last five starts overall previous to the Breeders' Cup.

Retirement

Panty Raid was retired from racing because of a torn suspensory ligament on May 27, 2008, during her 4-year-old season. She arrived May 29 of that year at Glencrest near Midway, Ky. to begin her broodmare career.

Her named foals are as follows:
 Hunting Ground, bay gelding by Street Cry (IRE), foaled March 1, 2010. Has won five of 27 starts as of May 2017.
 Theros, dark bay or brown gelding by Pulpit, foaled March 18, 2011. Has won two of six starts and has not raced since 2015.
 Interception, bay gelding by Distorted Humor, foaled April 9, 2012. Unraced.
 Pannonia, bay filly by Street Cry (IRE), foaled May 4, 2014. Unraced.

Pedigree

References

2004 racehorse births
Thoroughbred family 2-c
Racehorses bred in Kentucky
Racehorses trained in the United States